FluBot is a sophisticated SMS computer virus –specifically a banking Trojan– of global reach which aims to steal private data from Android smart phones. Unlike much malware, FluBot has proven exceptionally durable, coming in waves or "campaigns" with each redesign. It masquerades as innocuous messages such as missed calls and deliveries, asking the receiver to click links that download spyware. A variant, TeaBot, has infiltrated official app stores, including Google Play Store, in the guise of a QR-code reader.

16,000 reports of FluBot were reported to the Australian Competition & Consumer Commission's Scamwatch in Australia across eight weeks in 2021. Although coverage of FluBot primarily centres on Australia and New Zealand, the scam has also targeted European countries such as Germany and Poland in 2022 campaigns.

In May 2022, FluBot infrastructure was taken down in an operation involving 11 countries and it is not expected to resurge.

References

 
Virus
Internet security
Deception
Security breaches
Types of malware
Android (operating system) malware